Major-General Leonard Arthur Hawes CBE DSO MC DL (22 July 1892 − 7 August 1986) was a senior officer in the British Army who was responsible for preparing the transport to France of the British Expeditionary Force at the outbreak of World War II.

Biography
Leonard Arthur Hawes was born on 22 July 1892 in Throcking, Hertfordshire.  He was educated at Bedford Modern School and the Royal Military Academy, Woolwich.

Hawes served in World War I during which he was wounded, mentioned in despatches, made CBE and awarded the DSO, the MC and the Order of the Crown of Italy. Attending the Staff College, Camberley from 1925 to 1926, he served as a Major-General during World War II.

Hawes was made a Deputy Lieutenant for West Sussex in 1977 where he died on 7 August 1986.  His private papers, including an unpublished autobiography, are held at the Imperial War Museum.

References

Further reading

External links
Generals of World War II

1892 births
1986 deaths
British Army major generals
British Army generals of World War II
British Army personnel of World War I
Commanders of the Order of the British Empire
Companions of the Distinguished Service Order
Deputy Lieutenants of West Sussex
Graduates of the Royal Military Academy, Woolwich
Graduates of the Staff College, Camberley
Military personnel from Hertfordshire
People educated at Bedford Modern School
People from Hertfordshire
Recipients of the Military Cross
Royal Artillery officers